Albuquerque Lady Asylum was an American women's soccer team, founded in 2006. The team was a member of the Women's Premier Soccer League, the third tier of women's soccer in the United States and Canada. The team plays in the North Division of the Big Sky Conference. The team folded after the 2008 season.

The team played its home games in the stadium on the grounds of Menaul School in Albuquerque, New Mexico. The club's colors was sky blue, black and white.

The team was a sister organization of the men's Albuquerque Asylum team, which plays in the National Premier Soccer League.

Year-by-year

Coaches
  Peter Clinch 2007–present

Stadia
 Stadium at Menaul School, Albuquerque, New Mexico 2007–present

External links
 WPSL Albuquerque Lady Asylum page

Women's Premier Soccer League teams
Women's soccer clubs in the United States
Albuquerque Asylum
2006 establishments in New Mexico
Association football clubs established in 2006
2008 disestablishments in New Mexico
Association football clubs disestablished in 2008
Sports in Albuquerque, New Mexico
Women's sports in New Mexico